John Hill was a Scottish footballer who played as a left half.

Career
Born in Plains, Hill played club football for Airdrieonians, Queen's Park and Heart of Midlothian and made two appearances for Scotland. He won the Scottish Cup with Hearts in 1891, and later served as the club's president.

See also
List of Scotland national football team captains

References

1860 births
Date of birth missing
Year of death missing
Scottish footballers
Scotland international footballers
Scottish Football League players
Airdrieonians F.C. (1878) players
Queen's Park F.C. players
Heart of Midlothian F.C. players
Association football wing halves
Place of death missing
Footballers from North Lanarkshire
Heart of Midlothian F.C. directors and chairmen
Chairmen and investors of football clubs in Scotland